Norma Romm is a South African critical systems thinker interested in transformative research. She is a  professor at the Department of Adult, Community, and Continuing Education at the University of South Africa.

She was previously Dean of the Faculty of Social Sciences, University of Swaziland and deputy director of the Centre for Systems Studies, at the University of Hull.

Works
 The Methodologies of Positivism and Marxism (1991) London: Macmillan
 Accountability in Social Research (2001) Springer
 New Racism: Revisiting Researcher Accountabilities (2010) Springer
 Responsible Research Practice: Revisiting Transformative Paradigm in Social Research (2018) Springer

References

Living people
Academic staff of the University of South Africa
Year of birth missing (living people)
University of Eswatini
Academics of the University of Hull